The Thomas A. Crimmins House is a historic house at 19 Dartmouth Street in Newton, Massachusetts. The -story brick house was built in 1910–11, and is one of the city's finest Georgian Revival houses. The roughly square house has a slate hip roof with a modillioned cornice, and the corners have brick quoins. The facade facing Commonwealth Avenue has symmetrical projecting end bays flanking a center entry with monumental Tuscan columns.

The house was listed on the National Register of Historic Places in 1990.

See also
 National Register of Historic Places listings in Newton, Massachusetts

References

Houses on the National Register of Historic Places in Newton, Massachusetts
Colonial Revival architecture in Massachusetts
Houses completed in 1910